A list of American films released in 1961. 


Top-grossing films (U.S.)

A–B

C–I

J–R

S–Z

See also
 1961 in the United States

External links

1961 films at the Internet Movie Database
List of 1961 box office number-one films in the United States

1961
Films
Lists of 1961 films by country or language